Involv3r (stylised as Invol<3r) is a mix album by Welsh DJ Sasha, released on 18 March 2013 through Ministry of Sound. It is the third mix album in the Involver series, following 2008's Invol2ver. Like its predecessors, tracks from other artists have each been remixed to give Sasha's own interpretation of them. Upon release, the album charted at number 1 and number 6 on the UK Dance Albums and UK Compilation charts respectively.

Track listing

Charts

References

External links

Sasha (DJ) albums
2013 compilation albums